Poecilasmatidae is a family of goose barnacles.

Genera
The World Register of Marine Species includes the following genera in the family, including five genera from the former family Microlepadidae:
 Dianajonesia Koçak & Kemal, 2008
 Dichelaspis Darwin, 1852
 Glyptelasma Pilsbry, 1907
 Megalasma Hoek, 1883
 Microlepas Hoek, 1907
 Minyaspis Van Syoc & Dekelboum, 2011
 Octolasmis Gray, 1825
 Oxynaspis Darwin, 1852
 Pagurolepas Stubbings, 1940
 Poecilasma Darwin, 1852
 Rugilepas Grygier & Newman, 1991
 Scleraspis Van Syoc & Dekelboum, 2012
 Trilasmis Hinds, 1844
 † Archoxynaspis Van Syoc & Dekelboum, 2011

References

Barnacles
Crustacean families